Melipotis cellaris, the cellar melipotis moth, is a species of moth in the family Erebidae. It is found in Mexico (Morelos), Colombia, Venezuela, Paraguay, Argentina, Uruguay, the West Indies and the southern United States, where it has been recorded from Florida, Kansas, Louisiana, New Mexico and Texas.

The wingspan is 33–35 mm. Adults are on wing year round in Texas.

References

Moths described in 1852
Melipotis